At the 1991 Pan American Games there were thirteen rowing events for men and seven for women. Gold medals were won by teams from Canada, Cuba, Mexico and the United States.

Men's events

Women's events

Medal table 

Events at the 1991 Pan American Games
1991
1991 in rowing
Rowing in Cuba